The following mascots were used in the Africa Cup of Nations over the years.

List of mascots

See also
 List of FIFA World Cup official mascots
 List of UEFA European Championship official mascots
 List of Copa América official mascots
 List of AFC Asian Cup official mascots

References

External links

mascot
Association football mascots
Lists of mascots